The 1987 All-Ireland Senior Hurling Championship was the 101st staging of the All-Ireland Senior Hurling Championship, the Gaelic Athletic Association's premier inter-county hurling tournament. The championship began on 24 May 1987 and ended on 6 September 1987.

Cork were the defending champions but were defeated by Tipperary in the Munster final. Kerry fielded a team in the provincial championship for the first time since 1978.

On 6 September 1987, Galway won the championship following a 1-12 to 0-9 defeat of Kilkenny in the 100th All-Ireland final. This was their third All-Ireland title, their first in seven championship seasons.

Tipperary's Pat Fox was the championship's top scorer with 3-45. Galway's Joe Cooney was the choice for Texaco Hurler of the Year.

Results

Leinster Senior Hurling Championship

Munster Senior Hurling Championship

All-Ireland Senior Hurling Championship

Championship statistics

Miscellaneous

 Kerry take part in the Munster series of games for the first time since 1978.
 In the Munster semi-final replay against Limerick, Cork's John Fenton scored, what is often regarded as, one of the greatest hurling goals of all-time. Playing in his usual midfield position he struck the sliotar on the ground and scored a goal from forty-five yards out. In 2005 this goal was listed as one of RTÉ's Top 20 GAA Moments and, in a TG4 poll in 2009 it was voted the second greatest hurling goal of all-time.
 At the Munster final between Cork and Tipperary the official attendance is given as 56,005.  Two gates, however, were broken down before the start of the game and an estimated 3,000 people gained free entry to the Killinan terrace.
 The Leinster final between Kilkenny and Offaly is postponed due to damage to the Croke Park pitch following a U2 concert in June.

Top scorers

Overall

Single game

Clean sheets

References
 Corry, Eoghan, The GAA Book of Lists (Hodder Headline Ireland, 2005).
 Donegan, Des, The Complete Handbook of Gaelic Games (DBA Publications Limited, 2005).

External links
All-Ireland Senior Hurling Championship 1987 Results

1987
All-Ireland Senior Hurling Championship